Julien Le Paulmier (1520 in Agneaux – 1588) was a French Protestant and physician.

1520 births
1588 deaths
People from Manche
French Protestants
16th-century French physicians